Nürnberg-Stein station is a railway station in Nuremberg, Bavaria, Germany. It is served by the Nuremberg suburban train line S4. The station is on the Nuremberg–Crailsheim line of Deutsche Bahn.

References

Stein
Railway stations in Germany opened in 1875
Stein